The Saddle Club is an Australian-Canadian children's television series developed by Sarah Dodd, based on the books written by Bonnie Bryant. Like the book series, the scripted live action series follows the lives of three best friends in training to compete in equestrian competitions at the fictional Pine Hollow Stables, while dealing with problems in their personal lives. This series debuted in 2001 and ended in 2009.

Overview
The series revolves around the experiences of three girls, who form a club named "The Saddle Club" after recognizing their shared love for horse riding. Their rival is another young rider at the stables named Veronica DiAngelo.

Throughout the series, The Saddle Club navigates their rivalry with Veronica, training for competitions, horse shows, and the quotidian dramas that arise between friends and staff in the fictional Pine Hollow Stables. In each show, The Saddle Club prevails over its adversities, usually sending a message emphasizing the importance of friendship and teamwork.

Episodes

Cast

Note: A grey cell indicates the character did not appear in that series.

Production
The original series was filmed in Hurstbridge, Victoria, in Australia, but involved a cast of mixed nationalities.

In 2007, a news release announced a casting call and the production of a third series, which was filmed from late 2007 to early 2008. The third series was filmed in Daylesford,  Victoria.

Broadcast
The show was broadcast from 2001 until 2009, with 78 episodes over three series. The third series broadcast from 7 September 2008 to 10 April 2009.  Regionally, the cast of the television series released a series of music albums such as Friends Forever, On Top of the World, Secrets & Dreams and Hello World – The Best of the Saddle Club, and appeared in live performances such as the 2004 Sydney Royal Easter Show. A new Saddle Club CD, Best Friends, was sold in Australia in stores and on The Saddle Club's website and in the US and Canada as a digital download.

The popularity of the series soon after its premiere on YTV and the ABC promoted international syndication and it made its American debut in January 2002 on Discovery Kids.

In the United States, the series later aired on Horse Racing TV and was distributed independently by Connecticut Public Television and American Public Television through public television stations nationwide, most notably PBS. The series also briefly aired in reruns on The Hub.

In Canada, it aired on YTV, and in the UK on Horse & Country and Pop Girl. It was broadcast by the French children's specialty channel Gulli, dubbed into French.

Series 3 was broadcast on Discovery Kids in the United States starting on February 22, 2009, while sneak views has been shown on "Saddle Club Sundays" in December 2008. In Australia, the new series commenced on Channel Nine and WIN TV on March 7, 2009.

WIN Television airs a compilation movie of “Horse Shy”, “Mystery Weekend” and “School Horse” (episode 6-8 of series 1) every Christmas Day since 2017.

Other media

Australian Videos
The Saddle Club: Adventures At Pine Hollow (2001)
The Saddle Club: Horse Crazy (2002)
The Saddle Club: The Mane Event (2003)
The Saddle Club: The First Adventure (2003)
The Saddle Club: Friends Forever (2004)
The Saddle Club: Storm (2004)
The Saddle Club: Saving Pine Hollow (2005)

Australian DVDs
The Saddle Club: Adventures At Pine Hollow (2002)
The Saddle Club: Horse Crazy (2003)
The Saddle Club: The Mane Event (2003)
The Saddle Club: The First Adventure (2003)
The Saddle Club: Friends Forever (2004)
The Saddle Club: Storm (2004)
The Saddle Club: Saving Pine Hollow (2005)
The Saddle Club: Series 1 (2005)
The Saddle Club: Series 2 (2006)
The Saddle Club: The First Adventure (2009 Re-release)
The Saddle Club: Adventures at Pine Hollow (2009 Re-release) - Released as "More Adventures at Pine Hollow"
The Saddle Club: Horse Crazy (2009 Re-release)
The Saddle Club: The Mane Event (2009 Re-release)
The Saddle Club: Friends Forever (2009 Re-release)
The Saddle Club: Storm (2009 Re-release)
The Saddle Club: Saving Pine Hollow (2009 Re-release)
The Saddle Club: Back in the Saddle (2010)
The Saddle Club: Back in the Saddle (Handle Case) (2010)
The Saddle Club: Horseback Riders (2010)
The Saddle Club: Horseback Riders (Handle Case) (2010)
The Saddle Club: Ride Free (2010)
The Saddle Club: Staying the Distance (2010)
The Saddle Club: Happy Trails (2010)

Computer game
The Saddle Club: Willowbrook Stables (2002)
The Saddle Club (2010)

Discography

Studio albums

Compilation albums

Extended plays
Special Mane Event (2004)

Singles

Read Along CD
The Saddle Club: Horse Sense (2002) – ABC Audio 3-hour, 3-CD set read by Lucy Bell

Sophie & Kia

Albums
Planet Tokyo (2005) – Australia
He's Everything (2005) – Australia
Raw Beauty (2005) – Australia
Spin (2005) – Australia
Raw Beauty Acoustic Sessions (2005) – Australia
Singles
"Planet Tokyo" (2005) – No. 41 Australia
"He's Everything" (2005) – No. 40 Australia

Heli Simpson

Albums
Princess Veronica (2004)

Extended plays
Princess Veronica Tour (2004)

Singles
"Don't Ask Me" (2004) – No. 16 Australia

Ashley and Melanie

Singles
"Trouble" (2003) – No. 30 Australia

Awards

ARIA Music Awards

References

External links
The Saddle Club at the Australian Television Information Archive
The Saddle Club

The Saddle Club at Horse Racing TV
The Saddle Club at Australian Screen Online
The Saddle Club at AustLit

PBS Kids shows
Australian comedy-drama television series
Australian children's television series
Australian Broadcasting Corporation original programming
Canadian comedy-drama television series
2000s Canadian children's television series
Nine Network original programming
2001 Australian television series debuts
2009 Australian television series endings
2001 Canadian television series debuts
2009 Canadian television series endings
Television shows set in Victoria (Australia)
Television series about teenagers
Television series about horses
English-language television shows
Australian television shows based on children's books
Television series by Crawford Productions
PBS original programming